The 2017 National Premier Leagues NSW Grand Final was played on 10 September 2017, at Leichhardt Oval in Sydney. The match was contested between APIA Leichhardt Tigers and Manly United.

Manly United won the match, defeating APIA Leichhardt Tigers 3–4 on penalties after the match finished 0–0 after extra time.

Route to the final

Match

Details

External links
 Official NPL NSW Website

References

APIA Leichhardt FC
History of sport in Australia
Manly United FC